Elev is a small town in Aarhus Municipality, Central Denmark Region in Denmark with a population of 1,665 (1 January 2022).

Elev is situated 12 kilometers North-west of Aarhus on the northern slopes of Egådalen valley, between Lystrup and Trige, close to the motorway Djurslandsmotorvejen, which connects with E45. Elev is part of Elev Parish where Elev Church is situated.

References

External links 

Towns and settlements in Aarhus Municipality
Cities and towns in Aarhus Municipality